John J. Savage (December 6, 1910 – July 3, 1973) was an American politician in the state of Florida.

He served in the Florida House of Representatives from 1965 until his death in 1973 (46th district). He was serving as Minority Leader pro tempore in the House of Representatives when he died on July 3, 1973, after a heart attack. During his term of service in the House, he served on various committees including the Standards and Conduct Committee, General Regulations Committee, and Ethics Committee.

References

1910 births
1973 deaths
People from Pinellas County, Florida
Republican Party members of the Florida House of Representatives
20th-century American politicians